Svenskvollen is a village in the municipality of Hattfjelldal in Nordland county, Norway. The village lies along the river Vefsna (also called Susna) in the Susendal valley, just north of Børgefjell National Park. The village is home to Susendal Church, which serves the southern part of Hattfjelldal.

References

Hattfjelldal
Villages in Nordland